Compton and Shawford is a civil parish in the City of Winchester district, immediately southwest of the city, in Hampshire, England. Its main settlements are the villages of Compton and Shawford.

Description 
The word compton means village in a combe and aptly describes the settlement as it primarily consists of a long street on the side of a chalk valley.

Shawford is notable for having the longest railway viaduct in Hampshire (now known as Hockley Railway Viaduct). Disused since 1966, the viaduct was initially threatened with demolition when the M3 motorway was proposed but after much protest it was incorporated into the scheme.

The two halves of the parish are linked by Shawford Down which runs alongside the River Itchen. However they are now symbolically separated by the motorway with Compton on its west side and Shawford on its east.

Geology
The parish lies on the Upper Cretaceous chalk at the northern edge of the Hampshire Basin, dipping south from the Winchester anticline, with successively younger beds being exposed from north to south. In the north the Seaford Chalk formation of Santonian age makes up Compton Down. South of this the Newhaven Chalk outcrops in the dry valley running down from Oliver's Battery to Shawford. In the south of the parish the Culver Chalk of Campanian age is largely overlain by a layer of 'clay-with-flints' weathered out of the chalk. In the east the chalk is cut through by the Itchen valley and overlain by calcareous tufa.

A feature of the geology is the hill immediately southwest of the village of Shawford known as Shawford Down. This area is noted for its rich variety of habitats and the grazed pasture supports a wealth of flora and fauna, including notable insects and wildflowers.

Parish church 

All Saints' church in Compton is unusual in that it has two naves and two chancels, the original Norman constructions being supplemented by a new nave and chancel in 1905. A bell-turret was added to the church in 1880. The church's font appears to date from the Norman period.

Amenities 
National Cycle Route 23 passes through the parish, as do bus services provided by Bluestar. The M3 motorway also goes through the parish, with junction 11 to the north and junction 12 to the south. Shawford railway station is served by stopping services on the South West Main Line.

The parish is crossed from east to west by the Monarch's Way long distance footpath, and from north to south by the Itchen Way.

Compton is represented in the Hampshire Cricket League as one half of Compton & Chandlers Ford CC following the merging of Compton & Shawford CC and Chandlers Ford CC in 1995. The club plays its home games at the Memorial playing fields, just off of Shepards Lane.

In media
Shawford was the location for Victor Meldrew's death the One Foot in the Grave episode "Things Aren't Simple Any More". It is referred to in Robyn Hitchcock's song "Winchester".

Shawford railway station was featured in a 1974 film starring Sophia Loren, a remake of Brief Encounter, as was Winchester station (though most filming took place at Brockenhurst). It caused great excitement in the village; a large crowd watched the actress being filmed getting out of a car on the forecourt.

Jon Tufnell, the leader of the band Plastic Toys, is a former resident of Compton and it was in his home studio in the village that he recorded the album For Tonight Only, which included the single "Let Me Feel The Love". It charted at Number 30 in the UK Indie Chart in 2007.

Nearby places
Otterbourne
Twyford
Colden Common
Winchester

References

Notes

Bibliography

External links

Civil parishes in Winchester